Waters of Eden is Tony Levin's second solo album, released in 2000. Most of the tracks feature a quartet of Levin, keyboardist Larry Fast, guitarist Jeff Pevar, and drummer Jerry Marotta. Additional musicians who appear throughout the album include keyboardists David Sancious and Warren Bernhardt, guitarist David Torn, and flautist Steve Gorn.

Track listing
 "Bone & Flesh" – 	6:46
 "Waters of Eden" – 	4:50
 "Icarus" – 	5:35
 "Gecko Walk" – 	4:58
 "Belle" – 	4:00
 "Pillar of Fire" – 	6:44
 "Boulevard of Dreams" – 	6:47
 "Opal Road" – 	6:23
 "Utopia" – 	8:03

The Japanese release contains a bonus track entitled "From Here to the Stars" and features different cover artwork.

Personnel
Warren Bernhardt – piano on track 7, engineer	
California Guitar Trio  – acoustic guitars on track 2
Larry Fast  – synthesizer (tracks 1, 4, 6, 8, 9), engineer	
Steve Gorn  – bansuri flute (tracks 1, 8), engineer	
Pete Levin  – synthesizer (track 5)
Tony Levin  – Music Man electric bass (tracks 3, 6), fretless bass, NS electric upright bass (track 6), NS electric cello (tracks 1, 2), engineer	
Jerry Marotta  – percussion, drums, Taos drum, engineer	
Jeff Pevar  – acoustic guitar (tracks 3, 8), electric guitar (tracks 3, 4, 6, 9), engineer	
David Sancious  – synthesizer (tracks 2, 3), piano (track 2), virtual soprano saxophone	
David Torn  – acoustic and electric guitars (track 1), electric oud, loops (track 1), drum processing (track 4)

Production
David Bottrill  – Mixing
Robert Frazza  – Engineer
Brandon Mason  – Engineer, Assistant Engineer
Trevor Sadler  – Mastering
David Tom  – Engineer
Artie Traum  – Producer

References

Tony Levin albums
2000 albums
Narada Productions albums